Nesbitt's is a brand of orange-flavored soft drink sold in the United States. Nesbitt's was originally produced by the Nesbitt Fruit Products Company of Los Angeles, California. The company also produced several other flavors of soft drink under the Nesbitt's brand and other brand names, including Nesbitt's grape, strawberry and peach-flavored sodas.

History

The Nesbitt's Fruit Products Company was founded in 1924, named after its founder Hugh S. Nesbitt. The Nesbitt's brand debuted in 1927, initially as part of the company's line of soda fountain products.  Nesbitt's began bottling Nesbitt's orange and several other flavors in the late 1930s, putting it in direct competition with established market-leader Orange Crush.  Nesbitt's became the US market leader of orange soda pop during the late 1940s and 1950s, with advertisements featuring then-unknown model Marilyn Monroe in 1946, and proclaiming itself to be the "Largest selling bottled orange drink in the world".  Nesbitt's own brand of orange beverage was surpassed in popularity by Fanta in the late 1960s and then faded in popularity.  In 1972, the company was sold to The Clorox Company, and in April 1975, the bottling operation was sold to Moxie Industries, Inc. (later Monarch Beverage) of Atlanta.

Resurrection and legacy
Nesbitt's continued to be owned by Moxie Industries through the late 1970s and the 1980s while use of the Nesbitt's brand (for non-bottling usage) was passed along to several companies from 1976 through 1998, including ownership by Borden Inc. in the late 1980s. In 1999, Big Red, Limited of Waco, Texas, the parent company that owns rights to the Big Red soft drink brand, bought the Nesbitt's USA trademark from the Monarch Beverage Company under its North American Beverages Products division, which also includes NuGrape.  Although Big Red, Ltd. only actively promotes its Nesbitt's California Honey Lemonade drink, the company licenses the Nesbitt's soda brand to several small independent bottling companies throughout the US.

Retro soda producer Orca Beverage manufactures a bottled version of Nesbitt’s Orange made with cane sugar and natural flavoring. In addition to orange, strawberry and peach Nesbitt's sodas are also available.

The group Negativland put out the "Nesbitt's Lime Soda Song" on their 1987 release Escape From Noise; written and sung by Richard Lyons, it was about a man who lost his temper after "a bee flew into" his soda and "we had to throw it away".

Internationally, Monarch Beverages owns and distribute Nesbitt's sodas.

In 2018 Keurig - Green Mountain merged with Pepsi - Dr. Pepper, owner of North American Beverages to become Keurig Dr. Pepper.

In 2021 the Nesbitt's brand does not appear on Keurig - Dr. Pepper website. Bottlers report they cannot get beverage base. Keurig Dr. Pepper responds to telephone inquires that the brand has been discontinued. 

For the most recent information visit the Nesbitt's Orange Memorabilia Facts Page. This page is updated more frequently than this article.

Variants
(available outside U.S. only)
Nesbitt's Orange
Nesbitt's Apple
Nesbitt's Pineapple
Nesbitt's Sweet Red
Nesbitt's Grape
Nesbitt's Black Currant
Nesbitt's Still Honey Lemonade
Nesbitt's Still Kiwi Strawberry
Nesbitt's Splash Lemon Cola

References

External links
Nesbitt's Orange Memorabilia Page Contains photo albums of advertising, bottles and other items associated with the Nesbit Fruit Products Company.
Metropolitan News-Enterprise - Nesbitt’s Orange Soda: Bright Star Went Black, Now Twinkles Dimly from June 8, 2006.

Orange sodas
American soft drinks
Monarch brands
Cuisine of the Western United States